The Women's double short metric round paraplegic was an archery competition at the 1984 Summer Paralympics.

The French archer M. P. Balme won the gold medal.

Results

References

1984 Summer Paralympics events